The Donegall Lecturership at Trinity College Dublin, is one of two endowed mathematics positions at Trinity College Dublin (TCD), the other being the Erasmus Smith's Chair of Mathematics. The Donegall (sometimes spelt Donegal) Lectureship was endowed in 1668 by The 3rd Earl of Donegall. In 1675, after the restoration, it was combined with the previous public Professor in Mathematics position that had been created in 1652 by the Commonwealth parliament. For much of its history, the Donegall Lectureship was awarded to a mathematician as an additional honour which came with a supplementary income. Since 1967, the lectureship has been awarded to a leading international scientist who visits the Department of Pure and Applied Mathematics and gives talks, including a public lecture called the Donegall Lecture.

List of Donegall Lecturers

 1675–1685: Miles Symner (1610?–1686)   
 1685–1692: St. George Ashe (1657–1718)
 1692–1694: Charles Willoughby (1630?–1694)
 1694–1696: Edward Smyth (1665–1720)
 1696–1723: Claudius Gilbert (1670–1743)
 1723–1730: Richard Helsham (1682–1738)
 1730–1731: Charles Stuart (circa 1698–1746)
 1731–1734: Lambert Hughes (1698–1771)
 1734–1735: Robert Shawe (1699?–1752)
 1735–1738: Caleb Cartwright (1696?–1763)
 1738–1747: John Pellisier (1703–1781)
 1747–1750: John Whittingham (1712–1778)   
 1750–1759: William Clement (1707–1782)
 1759–1760: Theaker Wilder (1717–1777)
 1760–1762: John Stokes (1720?–1781)
 1762–1764: Richard Murray (1725?–1799) 
 1764–1769: Henry Joseph Dabzac (1737–1790)
 1769–1770: Henry Ussher (1741–1790)  
 1770–1782: Gerald Fitzgerald (1739?–1819)
 1782–1786: Matthew Young (1750–1800)
 1786–1790: Digby Marsh (1750?–1791)
 1790–1795: Thomas Elrington (1760–1835) 
 1795–1800: Whitley Stokes (1763–1845) 
 1800–1807: Robert Phipps (1765?–1844)
 1807–1820: James Wilson (1774?–1829)
 1820–1827: Richard MacDonnell (1787–1867)  
 1827–1832: Henry Harte (1790–1848) 
 1832–1847: Thomas Luby (1800–1870) 
 1847–1858: Andrew Hart (1811–1890) 
 1858–1867: George Salmon (1819–1904)
 1867–1876: William Roberts (1817–1883)
 1876–1884: Benjamin Williamson (1828–1916)
 1884–1904: Arthur Panton (1843–1906)
 1904–1907: Robert Russell (1858?–1938)
 1917–1923: Reginald Rogers (1874–1923)
 1923–1926: Charles Rowe (1893–1943)
 1926–1944: TS (Stan) Broderick (1893–1962)
 1967–1968: Paul Halmos (1916–2006) Spinsters, sequences and the Schroeder-Berstein theorem
 1969–1970: James Hamilton (1918–2000) Discrete symmetry properties and elementary particles
 1970–1971: Friedrich Hirzebruch (1927–2012) Some relations between topology and number theory
 1971–1972: Ailsa Land (1927–2021) Mathematical programming
 1972–1973: Dennis Sciama (1926–1999) Black holes and the future of astronomy
 1976–1977: Christopher Zeeman (1925–2016) Introduction to catastrophe theory
 1978–1979: Dennis Lindley (1923–2013) Decision making, probability and the law
 1979–1980: Heini Halberstam (1926–2014) The formation of mathematical concepts: the vibrating string controversy
 1982–1983: Lior Tzafriri (1936–2008) New results and problems in the geometry of normed spaces
 1983–1984: Marc Yor (1949–2014) Brownian Motion
 1985–1986: Roy Kerr (born 1934) Black holes
 1986–1987: Wilhelm Kaup Jordan algebras and analysis
 1988–1989: T. J. Willmore Variational problems for surfaces
 1989–1990: Jacob Schwartz (1930–2009) Mathematical problems in neuroscience and neural nets
 1991–1992: Donald Knuth (born 1938) Stable husbands
 1994–1995: Freeman Dyson (born 1923) The evolution of science
 1996–1997: Christopher Isham (born 1944) The challenge of quantum gravity
 1997–1998: James Lighthill (1924–1998) A century of shock waves
 1998–1999: Michael Berry (born 1941) Seven wonders of physics
 1999–2000: Chen Nigh Yang (born 1922)
 2000–2001: Robbert Dijkgraaf (born 1960) The unreasonable effectiveness of physics in modern mathematics
 2002–2003: David Gross (born 1941) The coming revolutions in physics
 2003–2004: Ludwig Faddeev (1934–2017) Development of physics from a mathematical point of view
 2005–2010: Tony Bell A view of theoretical neuroscience and machine learning
 2010: Ludvig Faddeev (1934–2017)

References

 
Professorships at Trinity College Dublin
Professorships in mathematics